Leon McCawley (born 12 July 1973) is a British classical pianist.

He studied with Heather Slade-Lipkin at Chetham's School of Music in Manchester, and with Eleanor Sokoloff at The Curtis Institute of Music in the United States, and latterly pianist Nina Milkina was a source of inspiration.

He won the first prize in the Ninth International Beethoven Piano Competition in Vienna in 1993, and second prize in the Leeds International Pianoforte Competition. He has given solo performances with major orchestras such as the London Philharmonic Orchestra and Royal Philharmonic Orchestra.

McCawley has produced CD recordings of music by Samuel Barber, by Ludwig van Beethoven, and by Robert Schumann, as well as a complete edition of Mozart's piano sonatas and a world premiere recording of the complete piano works of Hans Gál. Two of his recordings have earned the "Editor's Choice" award of the journal The Gramophone.

References

External links

 

1973 births
Living people
Curtis Institute of Music alumni
Prize-winners of the Leeds International Pianoforte Competition
British classical pianists
Male classical pianists
People educated at Chetham's School of Music
21st-century classical pianists
21st-century British male musicians